The Mikkeli Province was a province of Finland from 1831 to 1997. The province was named after the city of Mikkeli.

Parts of the province were transferred to the Central Finland Province in 1960. In 1997 it was merged with Kuopio Province and Northern Karelia Province into the new Eastern Finland Province.

Maps

|

|

Municipalities in 1997 (cities in bold) 

Anttola
Enonkoski
Hartola
Haukivuori
Heinola
Heinävesi
Hirvensalmi
Joroinen
Juva
Jäppilä
Kangaslampi
Kangasniemi
Kerimäki
Mikkeli
Mikkelin mlk
Mäntyharju
Pertunmaa
Pieksämäki
Pieksämäen mlk
Punkaharju
Puumala
Rantasalmi
Ristiina
Savonlinna
Savonranta
Sulkava
Sysmä
Virtasalmi

Former municipalities (disestablished before 1997) 
 Heinolan mlk
 Sääminki

Governors 
Abraham Joakim Molander-Nordenheim 1831–1837
Gabriel Anton Cronstedt 1837–1840
Otto Abraham Boije 1840–1847
Alexander Thesleff 1847–1853
Carl Fabian Langenskiöld 1853–1854
Carl Emil Cedercreutz 1854–1856
Bernhard Indrenius 1856
Samuel Werner von Troil 1856–1863
Theodor Sebastian Gustaf Thilén 1863–1869
Carl Gustav Mortimer von Kraemer 1869–1873
Edvard Reinhold von Ammondt 1874–1875
Hjalmar Sebastian Nordenstreng 1876–1883
August Alexander Järnefelt 1883–1884
Gustav Axel Samuel von Troil 1884–1889
Johannes Gripenberg 1889–1891
Knut Robert Carl Walfrid Spåre 1891–1899
Lennart Fritiof Munck 1900–1903
Aleksander Watatzi 1903–1905
Anton Leonard von Knorring 1905–1910
Eliel Ilmari Vuorinen 1910–1911
Leo Aristides Sirelius 1911–1916
Nikolai Sillman 1916–1917
Aleksanteri August Aho 1917
 Ernst Edvard Rosenqvist 1918–1927
 Albin Pulkkinen 1927–1933
 Emil Jatkola 1933–1948
 Alpo Lumme 1949–1957
 Urho Kiukas 1957–1970
 Viljo Virtanen 1970–1979
 Uuno Voutilainen 1979–1989
 Juhani Kortesalmi 1989–1997

Provinces of Finland (1917–97)